Roberto Carcelen (born September 8, 1970), is a Peruvian-American cross-country skier, who competed at the 2010 and 2014 Winter Olympics for Peru. He was the first Peruvian person ever to compete at the Winter Olympics. He had learned the sport from his American wife.

At the 2010 Olympics, he competed in the 15 kilometre freestyle race, and placed 94th out of 95.

Carcelen qualified again in 2013 for the 2014 Winter Olympics in Sochi, Russia. He competed in the 15 kilometre classical race, although he broke a rib during training, and finished last out of 87 competitors who finished the race.

Carcelen is the founder and executive director of The Roberto Carcelen Foundation.

References 

1970 births
Living people
Peruvian male cross-country skiers
Olympic cross-country skiers of Peru
Cross-country skiers at the 2010 Winter Olympics
Cross-country skiers at the 2014 Winter Olympics
Skiers from Seattle
Peruvian emigrants to the United States
American male cross-country skiers